The 140s decade ran from January 1, 140, to December 31, 149.

Significant people
 Antoninus Pius, Roman Emperor (138–161)

References